The Castlereigh Dam (also spelled Castlereagh) is a gravity dam built across the Kehelgamu Oya, a major tributary to the Kelani River, approximately  south-west of Hatton, in the Central Province of Sri Lanka.

Reservoir and power station 
The dam creates the iconic Castlereigh Reservoir, which is almost entirely maintained by the inflow of water from the Kehalgamu Oya. The power station discharges the water into the Norton Reservoir, created by the Norton Dam, located at the same site.

Water airport 
The Castlereigh Reservoir is also home to the Castlereigh Water Airport, registered under the IATA code NUF.

See also 

 List of dams and reservoirs in Sri Lanka
 List of power stations in Sri Lanka

References 

1965 establishments in Ceylon
Buildings and structures in Nuwara Eliya District
Dams completed in 1965
Dams in Sri Lanka
Gravity dams
Hydroelectric power stations in Sri Lanka